Abby Ginzberg is an independent documentary film director and producer and founder of Ginzberg Productions. For the past 30 years, Ginzberg has been creating films that tackle discrimination and the legal profession.

Career 
She graduated from UC Hastings College of the Law in 1975, and taught at Boalt Hall School of Law from 1975 to 1976, and at New College School of Law from 1981 to 1985.

In 2005, Ginzberg released the documentary Soul of Justice: Thelton Henderon's American Journey, which focused on federal district judge Thelton Henderson. Another film, A Tale of Two Cities, discusses the difficulty of forming high-school education for disadvantaged juvenile youths. Her film, Doing Justice: The Life and Trials of Arthur Kinoy, won a number of awards.

She also co-directed a documentary for the Ford Foundation chronicling the life of anti-apartheid freedom fighter and former Constitutional Court judge Albie Sachs, who lost an arm and an eye in an attack by the South African security services in Mozambique in 1988. The film is entitled “Soft Vengeance: Albie Sachs and the New South Africa.”

In 2015, Ginzberg collaborated with filmmaker Frank Dawson on Agents of Change, a documentary that covers the Civil Rights Movement and the creation of Ethnic studies departments at San Francisco State University and Cornell University.

Ginzberg is a member of Film Fatales women directors of independent film.

Select awards 

 Peabody Award, Soft Vengeance: Albie Sachs and the New South Africa (2014)
 Silver Gavel Award for Media and The Arts, 2006,  Soul of Justice: Thelton Henderson's American Journey (2006)
 CINE Golden Eagle Soul of Justice: Thelton Henderson's American Journey (2006)

Filmography 
Everyday Heroes (Documentary, 2001) Director & Producer

Soul of Justice: Thelton Henderson's American Journey (Documentary, 2005) Director & Producer

Cruz Reynoso: Sowing the Seeds of Justice (2010) Director & Producer

The Barber of Birmingham: Foot Soldier of the Civil Rights Movement (Documentary short, 2011) Consulting Producer

Soft Vengeance: Albie Sachs and the New South Africa (Documentary, 2014) Director & Producer

When Voices Meet: One Divided Country; One United Choir; One Courageous Journey (Documentary, 2015)  Collaborating Director

Ghost Town to Havana (Documentary, 2015) Consulting Producer

Agents of Change (Documentary, 2016) Director & Co-Producer

Waging Change (Documentary, 2017) Director & Producer

And Then They Came for Us (Documentary, 2017) Co-Director & Executive Producer

Barbara Lee: Warrior for Peace and Justice (Documentary, 2018) Director & Producer

Truth to Power: Barbara Lee Speaks for Me (Documentary, 2020) Director and Producer

References

External links

Year of birth missing (living people)
Living people
New College of California faculty
UC Berkeley School of Law faculty
University of California, Hastings College of the Law alumni
Film directors from California
American documentary film directors
Film producers from California
American women documentary filmmakers
American women academics
21st-century American women